Viola culminis is a plant in the family Violaceae, endemic to Northern Italy where it grows in Lombardy and Trentino-Alto Adige/Südtirol.

References

Flora of the Alps
Flora of Italy
culminis